Melittia gloriosa, the glorious squash vine borer or manroot borer, is a moth of the family Sesiidae. It is known from North America, including Arizona, California, New Mexico, Oklahoma and Texas.

The larvae feed on Cucurbita species. They develop on the tubers of the host plant

References

External links
mothphotographersgroup

Sesiidae
Moths described in 1881